Vermont College of Fine Arts (VCFA) is a private graduate-level art school in Montpelier, Vermont. It offers Master's degrees in low-residency and residential programs. Its faculty includes Pulitzer Prize finalists, National Book Award winners, Newbery Medal honorees, Guggenheim Fellowship and Fulbright Program fellows, and Ford Foundation grant recipients. The literary magazine Hunger Mountain is operated by VCFA writing faculty and students.

History
The focus of Vermont College has changed since its beginnings as Newbury Seminary in 1831. After existing in several forms including a Wesleyan Seminary and a Methodist Seminary, using the name Montpelier Seminary, it became Vermont Junior College in 1941.  In 1958, it became Vermont College. In 1972, Vermont College merged with Norwich University; the two schools became fully integrated in 1993. Union Institute & University acquired Vermont College in 2001. In 2008, the MFA programs separated from Union Institute & University, and Vermont College of Fine Arts (VCFA) was formed. 

The Master of Fine Arts (MFA) in Writing program was established in 1981 and the MFA in Visual Art in 1991. The MFA in Writing for Children & Young Adults, the first "MFA program in writing for young readers," began in January 1997. In 2008, Vermont College of Fine Arts became an independent institution. In 2011, it launched an MFA in Music Composition program and an MFA in Graphic Design program The MFA in Film program was established in 2013. In 2014, the residential MFA in Writing and Publishing began, and the Graduate Studies in Art & Design Education Program was established in 2015. The newest program is the International MFA in Creative Writing & Literary Translation, which enrolled its first students in 2018.

College Hall, the central building on campus, is listed on the National Register of Historic Places.
It was completed in 1872 and includes a two-story high chapel and a pipe organ from 1884.

On June 15, 2022, the college announced an end to on-campus residencies, moving the summer residencies to Colorado College, with the winter residences going all-virtual.

Academics

All programs feature writers-in-residence, artists-in-residence, and artist/scholars who give lectures, readings, and workshops. Artists- and writers-in-residence have included Jean Valentine, Richard Russo, Claudia Emerson, M. T. Anderson, Andrew Blauvelt, Susan Cooper, Meredith Davis, Gregory Maguire, Holly Black, Jane Yolen, Wu Tsang, and Stephen Drury.

Low-residency
In the low-residency structure, students earn their graduate degrees through brief, on-campus residencies, self-designated study, flexible scheduling, and personalized attention through one-on-one guidance with a faculty mentor. The on-campus residencies consist of workshops, lectures, readings, panel discussions, student-teacher conferences and critiques, and presentations of works in progress." A faculty member works with five or fewer students through written correspondence and electronic/video/telephone communication in between residencies.

Faculty
Approximately 60 authors, designers, filmmakers, composers, artists, and scholars teach at Vermont College. All have terminal degrees in their specialty.

Notable alumni

Vermont College of Fine Arts
Notable alumni of the Vermont College of Fine Arts include:
Julie Berry
Millicent Borges Accardi (poet) 
W.E. Butts
Marcus Cafagna
Mary Clyde
Mark Cox (poet)
Olena Kalytiak Davis
Alison Hawthorne Deming
Ted Deppe
Alicia Erian
Clark T. Hinman
Yamile Saied Mendez
Henry Sanborn Noyes
Frank Giampietro
Gail Gregg
Pamela Harrison
Katherine Hastings
Allison Hedge Coke
LeAnne Howe
Patricia Spears Jones
Darrell Kipp
Tracy Krumm
Nancy Lagomarsino
Wally Lamb
Kapulani Landgraf 
Martine Leavitt
Moira Linehan
Jo-Ann Mapson
Lou Mathews
Linda McCartney
Alyce Miller
David Mura
An Na
Sandra Novack
April Ossmann
Jamie Parsley
Elizabeth Powell
Melissa Pritchard
Bill Rasmovicz
Tim Seibles
Betsy Sholl
Janaka Stucky
Don Swartzentruber
Jennifer K. Sweeney
Kali Vanbaale
Martha M. Vertreace-Doody
Marjorie Welish
Deborah Wiles
Valerie Wohlfeld
Ibi Zoboi

Notable alumni of Newbury Academy
Notable alumni of Newbury Academy include:
 Horace W. Bailey
 George C. Chamberlain
 James M. King
 Caroline Burnham Kilgore
 Janette Hill Knox
 George McKendree Steele

References

External links

 
Private universities and colleges in Vermont
Buildings and structures in Montpelier, Vermont
Education in Washington County, Vermont
Tourist attractions in Washington County, Vermont
Art museums and galleries in Vermont
Educational institutions established in 1831
1831 establishments in Vermont
Art schools in Vermont